Christian Taylor may refer to:

Christian Taylor (athlete) (born 1990), American triple jumper
Christian Taylor (screenwriter) (born 1968), American screenwriter for series including Six Feet Under and Lost

See also
Christian Alusine Kamara-Taylor
Chris Taylor (disambiguation)